Kristine Smith is an American science fiction and fantasy author.  In 2001, she won the John W. Campbell Award for Best New Writer. She lives in northern Illinois.

In 2009, she donated her archive to the department of Rare Books and Special Collections at Northern Illinois University.

Since 2015, Smith has been publishing thrillers using the pseudonym "Alex Gordon."

Novels

As Kristine Smith
 Code of Conduct (1999)
 Rules of Conflict (2000)
 Law of Survival (2001)
 Contact Imminent (2003)
 Endgame (2007)

As Alex Gordon
Gideon (2015)
Jericho (2016)

References

External links
Kristine Smith's home page
Alex Gordon's home page

Living people
Year of birth missing (living people)
20th-century American novelists
21st-century American novelists
20th-century American women writers
21st-century American women writers
American science fiction writers
American women novelists
American women short story writers
John W. Campbell Award for Best New Writer winners
Women science fiction and fantasy writers
20th-century American short story writers
21st-century American short story writers